Oscar Scherer State Park is a Florida State Park located between Sarasota and Venice, near Osprey. The address is 1843 South Tamiami Trail. There are more than 250,000 visitors a year.

History
The park's genesis was in 1955, when Elsa Scherer Burrows, owner of the  South Creek Ranch, died. Her will left the ranch to the state to form a park. It was to be dedicated to the memory of her father, Oscar Scherer, who had, in 1872, developed a shoe leather dyeing process. A year later, the park was ready and opened to visitors.

Thirty years after that, realtor and environmentalist Jon Thaxton started work to protect the neighboring Florida scrub jay territory.

Biology

Flora
The habitats that are part of the park are pine flatwoods, scrubby flatwoods and the hardwood hammock surrounding South Creek. A variety of other plants exist within the park, like blueberry, persimmon, wild grape, cabbage palm, coontie, wax myrtle, prickly pear cacti, mangrove trees and giant leather ferns (Acrostichum danaeifolium).

Fauna
Land and aquatic inhabitants include bobcats, rabbits, foxes, North American river otters, American alligators, eastern indigo snakes (Drymarchon couperi), gopher tortoises and gopher frogs.

The park is one of the few places in the state where there are enough scrubby flatwoods for the Florida scrub jay to maintain a healthy population. Other birds that can be seen in the park are bald eagles, ospreys, warblers, woodpeckers, egrets, and the great blue and little blue heron.

The  freshwater Lake Osprey has bream, bluegill, largemouth bass and channel catfish, among others. South Creek is brackish, so it can contain saltwater fish.

Recreational activities
The park has such amenities as beaches, bicycling, boating, canoeing, fishing, hiking, kayaking, picnicking, snorkeling, swimming and wildlife viewing. It also has an interpretive exhibit and visitor center.  The Legacy Trail, which runs on a former railroad route, also runs through and connects with the park.

References

External links

 Oscar Scherer State Park at Florida State Parks
 Oscar Scherer State Park at the University of Florida Center for Aquatic and Invasive Plants
 Elsa Scherer Burrows at the Office of Cultural & Historical Programs
 Friends of Oscar Scherer State Park

State parks of Florida
Parks in Sarasota County, Florida
Protected areas established in 1956
Nature centers in Florida